The BlackSheeps was a Norwegian Sami band from Nesseby. Their breakthrough came following their participation in the MGP jr, a song contest for children organised by Norwegian state broadcaster NRK. Having won MGP jr 2008 with the song Oro jaska, beana (Be Quiet, Dog) the group went on to represent Norway in the MGP Nordic 2008. They also won this competition after receiving more than half the votes. The band was recently the subject of a legal dispute over the dismissal of two band members, unpaid royalties, and the right to use the band name. However, it was ruled that the band still holds the right to the name, and former band members Alexander Touryguin and Viktoria Eriksen are not owed any money.

Career
The group was formed in 2008 by singer Agnete Johnsen, guitarist Emelie Nilsen, bassist Alexander Touryguin, and drummer Viktoria Eriksen. On 2 June 2007 the group participated in Melodi Grand Prix Junior 2008 with their song "Oro, Jaska, Beana." The group won the contest and went on to represent Norway in MGP Nordic 2008. On 29 November 2008 the group won MGP Nordic 2008 after receiving more than half of the votes. "Oro, Jaska, Beana" reached #1 in the Norwegian Singles Charts afterwards. In June 2010, Touryguin and Eriksen were dismissed from the band and were replaced by Nikolaj Gloppen and Simon Stenvoll Pedersen respectively. In 2011, the band participated in Melodi Grand Prix 2011, with their song "Dance Tonight." They ultimately came 2nd place, losing out to the song "Haba Haba" by Stella Mwangi. The band became the subject of a legal dispute over the dismissal of Touryguin and Eriksen, unpaid royalties and the right to use the band name. However, it was ruled that the band still holds the right to the name, and Touryguin and Eriksen are not owed any money.

Personnel

Current members
 Agnete Johnsen (born 4 July 1994) – Vocals
 Nikolaj Gloppen (born 1992) - Bass
 Simon Stenvoll Pedersen (born 1992) – Drums
 Emelie Nilsen (born 29 March 1993) – Guitar

Former members
 Alexander Touryguin (born 16 October 1993) – Bass
 Viktoria Eriksen (born 6 July 1993) – Drums

Discography

Albums

Singles

Trivia 
In a live chat on the website of Norwegian newspaper VG, the group was confronted with the grammatical incorrectness of their name. The group said they were aware that “sheeps” was not the correct plural form but contended that this did not matter. “Many bands have spelling mistakes in their name, such as The Beatles. Remember it’s just a band name, so anything works,” was their reply.

References

Official website
http://www.blacksheeps.no/

Norwegian pop music groups
Melodi Grand Prix contestants
Melodi Grand Prix Junior contestants
Musical groups established in 2008
2008 establishments in Norway
Musical groups from Finnmark